Macedonia can refer to:
 Macedonia, Liberty County, Texas
 Macedonia, Williamson County, Texas